Snideh  is a Syrian village located in Salamiyah Subdistrict in Salamiyah District, Hama.  According to the Syria Central Bureau of Statistics (CBS), Snideh had a population of 706 in the 2004 census.

References 

Populated places in Salamiyah District